Ammonium lactate is a compound with formula NH4(C2H4(OH)COO). It is the ammonium salt of lactic acid. It has mild anti-bacterial properties.

It has E number "E328" and is the active ingredient of the skin lotions Amlactin and Lac-Hydrin.

Ammonium lactate is the chemical combination of lactic acid and ammonium hydroxide. It is used as a skin moisturizer lotion to treat dry, scaly, itchy skin. Those who are using it should avoid exposure to sunlight or artificial UV rays, such as sunlamps or tanning beds. Ammonium lactate makes skin more sensitive to sunlight, and skin is more likely to sunburn.

References

Lactates
Ammonium compounds